Sneaker was a West Coast American rock band, active from 1973 to 1983. The band is best known for its Billboard Hot 100 Top 40 hit single, "More Than Just the Two of Us", from its first album, Sneaker (1981). They also had a minor hit with "Don't Let Me In", a song written by Donald Fagen and Walter Becker from Steely Dan.

Sneaker was composed of Tim Torrance on guitars, Mitch Crane on vocals and guitars, Michael Carey Schneider on vocals and keyboards, Mike Hughes on drums, Michael Cottage on bass guitar, and Jim King on keyboards, synthesizers, and vibes. The band cited as its primary musical influences Steely Dan, Eagles and The Doobie Brothers. They released 2 studio albums on Handshake Records and Tapes, Sneaker in 1981 (which included their Top 40 hit, "More Than Just the Two of Us") and Loose in the World in 1982. Both albums were produced by Jeff "Skunk" Baxter. In 2001, Cool Sound Records, a Japanese record label, released Early On, a collection of their early recordings and, in 2003, released Footprints In Japan, a 1982 live recording from Osaka & Tokyo, Japan.

The group's name "Sneaker" was taken from the Steely Dan song "Bad Sneakers" from their album Katy Lied, a fact confirmed by Michael Carey Schneider.

Discography

Albums

Singles

See also
List of 1980s one-hit wonders in the United States

References

External links
Sneaker's MySpace Page
Sneaker's Other MySpace Page  
West Coast Pop
Sneaker's FaceBook page
Sneaker Picture
Michael Carey Schneider's 'Sneaker' FaceBook Page

Rock music groups from California
American soft rock music groups
Musical groups from Los Angeles